Ídolos Brazil 5, also taglined as Ídolos 2010 was the fifth season of Brazilian reality interactive talent show Ídolos and third season aired on Rede Record. It premiered on Thursday, June 10, 2010 with a 2-hour special premiere.

Rodrigo Faro returned as a host from last year and the judging panel again consists of Luís Calainho, Paula Lima and Marco Camargo.

Israel Lucero won the competition with Tom Black as the first runner-up and Nise Palhares finishing third.

Judges Luis Calainho and Paula Lima left the show after this season ended, although only Calainho's departure was announced in advance.

Early Process

Regional Auditions

Auditions were held in the following cities:

During this stage guest judges filled in a special fourth judging seat.

Theater Round

Chorus Line
The first day of Theater Week featured the eighty-three contestants from the auditions round. Divided into groups, the contestants go up on stage and individually sing a song a capella. Fifty-two advanced.

Groups
The fifty-two remaining contestants were divided in groups of four or three. They had to pick a song and sing accompanied by a soundtrack. Thirty advanced.

Solos
The thirty remaining contestants had to choose a music and singing accompanied by a band and can also play an instrument. In the end, the judges take the contestants individually and tell them if they made the final fifteen.

Semi-finals

Semi-finalists
The fifteen semi-finalists were officially announced on July 22, 2010.

(ages stated at time of contest)

The fifteen semi-finalists performed live on July 27, 2010, with results show on the following episode which aired on July 29, 2010. The five singers with the highest percentage of the public vote were automatically qualified for the finals. Later on night, the judges decided which five out of the remaining ten semi-finalists completed the Top 10.

Top 15 – Sing Your Idol

Finals

Finalists
The ten finalists were officially announced on July 29, 2010, after the semi-final round results be revealed.

(ages stated at time of contest)

Top 10 – Jovem Guarda

 Guest Judge: Eduardo Araújo

Top 9 – Love Songs

Top 8 – Country

 Guest Judge: Lucas Silveira

Top 6 – 2000's Hits

 Guest Judge: Di Ferrero

Top 5 – Popular Songs

 Guest Judges: Joelma & Chimbinha
Each contestant sang two songs.

Top 4 – Bossa Nova & The Festivals

 Guest Judge: Luiza Possi
Each contestant sang one solo and one duet with a fellow contestant.

Top 3 – Judges' Choice, Public's Choice & Contestant's Choice

Each contestant sang three songs.

Top 2 – Winner's Single 1, Season's Best & Winner's Single 2

 Guest Judge: Branco Mello

Each contestant sang three songs.

Elimination Chart

Results Night Performances

Ratings

Brazilian Ratings

 Each point represents 60.000 households in São Paulo and 37.000 households in Rio de Janeiro.

References

External links
 Ídolos Brazil website

Ídolos (Brazilian TV series)
2010 Brazilian television seasons